Doğan Erdoğan (born 22 August 1996) is a Turkish footballer who plays as a midfielder for Dutch club Fortuna Sittard.

Career
He made his TFF First League debut on 24 November 2012.

On 6 February 2019, Erdoğan was loaned out to FC Juniors OÖ for the rest of the season. Erdoğan moved back to Turkey and joined Trabzonspor on 28 June 2019. He penned a 3-year contract with an option for a further year.

On 7 July 2022, Erdoğan signed a three-year contract with Fortuna Sittard in the Netherlands.

Honours
Trabzonspor
Turkish Cup: 2019–20

References

External links
 
 
 

1996 births
Living people
Sportspeople from Samsun
Turkish footballers
Turkey youth international footballers
Turkey under-21 international footballers
Association football midfielders
Samsunspor footballers
LASK players
FC Juniors OÖ players
Trabzonspor footballers
Çaykur Rizespor footballers
Gaziantep F.K. footballers
Fortuna Sittard players
TFF First League players
2. Liga (Austria) players
Austrian Football Bundesliga players
Süper Lig players
Turkish expatriate footballers
Turkish expatriate sportspeople in Austria
Expatriate footballers in Austria
Turkish expatriate sportspeople in the Netherlands
Expatriate footballers in the Netherlands